The German Nationalist Party (DNP) was a First Republic political party in Czechoslovakia, representing the German population of Sudetenland. Its chairman and political face was Rudolf Lodgman von Auen.

In elections, the DNP worked together with the German National Socialist Workers' Party (DNSAP). Both parties were outlawed in 1933. A faction of the DNP then entered the Sudetendeutsche Heimatfront of Konrad Henlein.

The main party newspaper was the Nordböhmisches Tagblatt (North Bohemian Daily) published in Děčín.

See also
 Germans in Czechoslovakia (1918-1938)

Footnotes

References 
 

Interwar minority parties in Czechoslovakia
Banned political parties
German diaspora political parties
German nationalist political parties
Political parties disestablished in 1933